Banksia carlinoides, commonly known as the pink dryandra, is a species of shrub that is endemic to Western Australia. It has narrow egg-shaped to wedge-shaped leaves with a few sharply pointed serrations and heads of up to one hundred creamy white flowers, often tinged pink.

Description
Banksia carlinoides is a rounded, compact shrub that typically grows to a height of  but does not form a lignotuber.

Taxonomy and naming
This species was first formally described in 1848 by Carl Meissner who gave it the name Dryandra carlinoides and published the description in Lehmann's Plantae Preissianae. The specific epithet (carlinoides) is a reference to a perceived similarity to plants in the genus Carlina. In 2007 Austin Mast and Kevin Thiele transferred all dryandras to the genus Banksia.

Distribution and habitat
Pink dryandra grows in low kwongan and is widespread between Geraldton, Gingin and Piawaning.

References

 

carlinoides
Plants described in 1848
Endemic flora of Western Australia
Eudicots of Western Australia
Taxa named by Kevin Thiele